Datuk Tey Seu Bock  (born 21 February 1973) is a retired Malaysian professional badminton player. He is most well known for being the coach of three-time Olympic silver medalist and former world No. 1 badminton men's singles shuttler Lee Chong Wei between 2010 and 2016. Tey currently serves as coach of the men's singles department at the Badminton Association of Malaysia (BAM).

As a player, he was active in both men's singles and doubles until his retirement.

Background
Tey was born in the tourist destination of Pengkalan Balak in the historical Malaysian state of Malacca.  Following limited success in his playing career, he turned to coaching and remained as an assistant to Misbun Sidek for a large number of years acting as sparring partner to players such as Rashid Sidek, Muhammad Roslin Hashim and eventually Lee himself.  He once ventured into the kopi tiam (traditional coffee shop) business in an attempt to strengthen his financial situation but the business failed after a year.

Career

1995
Men's Doubles

1994
Men's Singles

1993
Men's Singles

Men's Doubles

1992
Men's Singles

1991
Men's Singles

Men's Doubles

 BWF International Series tournament

Coaching
Tey joined the BAM in 2002 and became an understudy to Misbun Sidek. Following Misbun's resignation from the BAM in 2010, Tey was chosen to take over coaching responsibilities of the men's singles department and take world No. 1 Lee Chong Wei under his wing. Under his watch, Lee would go on to clinch, among many, two more Olympic silver medals, four world championships silver medals and three All England Open Badminton Championships men's singles titles.

Following the coaching reshuffle at BAM in 2017, Tey was re-assigned and has since served as head coach of Malaysia's national women's singles department.

In May 2020, the BAM once again restructured their national coaching setup which saw Tey returning to the men's singles squad as assistant to head coach, Hendrawan. Another Indonesian, Indra Wijaya, succeeded Tey as women's singles head coach.

Honours
  :
  Companion Class II of the Order of Malacca (DPSM) - Datuk (2017)

References

1973 births
Living people
People from Malacca
Malaysian sportspeople of Chinese descent
Malaysian male badminton players
Badminton coaches
21st-century Malaysian people
20th-century Malaysian people